Yengo is a surname. Notable people with the surname include:

Brigitte Yengo, Congolese nun
Patrice Yengo (born 1949), Congolese anthropologist

Surnames of African origin